Antonia "Toya" Johnson-Rushing ( Johnson, formerly Carter and Wright; born October 26, 1983) is an American reality television personality.

Early life
Johnson was born in New Orleans, Louisiana. She is the second child of Anita Johnson and Walter Andrews.

Career
In 2009, Johnson and Tameka "Tiny" Harris from the R&B group Xscape (also wife of rapper T.I.) starred on a reality show on BET called Tiny and Toya.

She wrote a book called Priceless Inspirations, as well a memoir titled In My Own Words..My Real Reality, How to Lose a Husband, and You Just Don't Get It with her daughter, Reginae Carter. She owns a boutique called G.A.R.B. in New Orleans, Louisiana, and GARB Shoetique in Smyrna, Georgia. Johnson starred in her own reality show on BET called Toya: A Family Affair which consisted of 16 episodes of one season in 2011.

Personal life

At age 14, Johnson and rapper Lil Wayne met when she was at a corner store and Wayne was standing outside in New Orleans, Louisiana. She became pregnant with their daughter at the 
age of 14. Lil Wayne was already signed to Cash Money Records as a burgeoning rapper. He ultimately chose to fully pursue his rap career with Cash Money Records in order to support his child. When she was 15 and Lil Wayne was 16, Johnson gave birth to their daughter, Reginae Carter on November 29, 1998. Years later, upon Lil Wayne achieving stardom, they were married on February 14, 2004. In January 2006, however, after almost two years of marriage, the couple separated, citing her inability to cope with his lifestyle, most specifically his career keeping him away from home for long periods of time. Despite being divorced, the two have remained good friends and continued to raise their daughter together.

On June 18, 2011, Johnson and Memphitz were married in Atlanta. The wedding guest list included rapper Rasheeda, Tameka Harris, Kandi Burruss, Nivea, Lauren London, Monica Brown, and Tamar Braxton. In February 2015, Johnson confirmed that she and Wright had separated after almost four years of marriage.

On July 31, 2016, Johnson's brothers Josh and Rudy were shot in New Orleans while inside of their car.

On February 8, 2018, Johnson gave birth to baby girl, Reign, with her now husband, Robert" Red" Rushing. Johnson and Rushing married on October 15, 2022 in Cabo San Lucas.

Filmography

References

1983 births
Living people
21st-century American businesspeople
21st-century American writers
African-American television personalities
African-American women writers
African-American screenwriters
African-American women rappers
American women rappers
Rappers from New Orleans
American television writers
Businesspeople from New Orleans
Lil Wayne
Participants in American reality television series
American women television writers
Writers from New Orleans
African-American businesspeople
21st-century American women writers
21st-century American rappers
21st-century American women musicians
21st-century American businesswomen
21st-century women rappers